The Gold Drum and Bugle Corps is an Open Class competitive junior drum and bugle corps. Based in Oceanside, California, Gold performs in Drum Corps International (DCI) competitions.

History
Sources:

The Hawthorne Gold Drum and Bugle Corps was founded in 2005 in Hawthorne, California, by Dr. Donald Flaherty & Juan C. Leguizamon. Dr. Flaherty was the corps' executive director until 2022.

For its first five seasons, the corps competed only within the state of California. In 2010, the corps relocated to Oceanside, in order to be accessible to more of the youth of Southern California and changed its name to Gold Drum and Bugle Corps.

The corps first ventured out of California in 2011, traveling to Salt Lake City for one performance, then on to Loveland and Denver, Colorado for DCI's Drums Along the Rockies regional competitions.

Gold first attended the DCI World Championships in 2007, when DCI traveled west to Pasadena. Since 2012, Gold has traveled to the Midwest to attend the DCI World Championships in Michigan City, Marion, and Indianapolis, Indiana.

In 2013, Gold was joined by students from the Laizhou Martial Arts Institute of Laizhou, China as performers in the corps' show, "East Meets West." The school had been featured performers in the 2008 Beijing Olympics Opening Ceremony.

Sponsorship
The Gold Drum and Bugle Corps is sponsored by Gold Youth Arts Organization, Inc., a 501(c)(3) musical organization. The Executive Director is Donald Flaherty.

Show summary (2005–2022)
Source:

References

External links
Official website

Drum Corps International Open Class corps
Musical groups established in 2005
Organizations based in California
2005 establishments in California